The 1935–36 Scottish Second Division was won by Falkirk who, along with second placed St Mirren, were promoted to the First Division. Dumbarton finished bottom.

Table

References 

 Scottish Football Archive

Scottish Division Two seasons
2
Scot